Thibaw may refer to:
 Thibaw Min (1859–1916), last king of Burma, Konbaung Dynasty
 Thibaw (Shan State), Myanmar (Burma)